Solidago durangensis is very rare Mexican species of flowering plants in the family Asteraceae. It is known only from a few collections made in the 1890s near the city of Durango in northern Mexico, and not seen since. It is very likely now extinct.

Solidago durangensis is (was?) a perennial herb up to 100 cm (40 inches) tall. Leaves were lance-shaped, up to 10 cm (4 inches) long. Flower heads are in flat-topped arrays at the ends of branches.

References

durangensis
Flora of Durango
Plants described in 1991